Eric Lissenden (born 1 January 1972) is a former Australian rules footballer who played with North Melbourne in the Australian Football League (AFL).

Lissenden first came to North Melbourne via the 1989 National Draft, from Neerim-Neerim South. He was a key position forward and finished as the leading goalkicker in the Under 19s league for the 1990 season but didn't get to make a senior appearance. He instead made his way to Essendon, in the 1992 Mid-Season Draft. At Essendon he also failed to appear at AFL level but was given a second chance by North Melbourne in the 1995 National Draft, while playing for Warragul Industrials. He finally made his AFL debut in round 14 of the 1996 season in a win over Carlton at the Melbourne Cricket Ground and played his only other senior game the following round against Collingwood.

References

External links
 
 

1972 births
Australian rules footballers from Victoria (Australia)
North Melbourne Football Club players
Living people